The National Institute of Parasitic Diseases (Shanghai), China) is an institution within the Chinese Center for Disease Control and Prevention, which contains:

 The Department of Schistosomiasis
 The Department of Malaria
 The Department of Leishmaniasis, Filariasis and Echinococcosis
 The Editorial Department of Chinese Journal of Parasitology and Parasitic Diseases and International Journal of Medical Parasitic Diseases, a health education center

The precursor of National Institute of Parasitic Diseases is the East China Branch of the National Institute of Health, established in Nanjing in 1950. And then it was part of the Chinese Academy of Medical Sciences in 1956.

References

Medical and health organizations based in China
Research institutes in China